Madonna (born 1958) is an American singer-songwriter and actress.

Madonna  may also refer to:

People
 Mary, mother of Jesus
 Madonna (name), a given name or surname originally from Italian
 Madonna (nickname), a moniker of several individuals after the American singer
 Madonna, a nickname of Joan Baez
 Madonna, leader of 1990s gang 5T

Art
 Madonna (art), pictorial or sculptured representations of Mary, mother of Jesus
 Madonna (Munch), an 1895 painting by Edvard Munch

Film
 Madonna (1999 film), a Croatian film
 Madonna (2015 film), a South Korean film

Music

Albums
 Madonna (Madonna album) (1983)
 Madonna (Alisha Chinai album) (1989)
 Madonna (...And You Will Know Us by the Trail of Dead album) (1999)
 Madonna (EP), a 2010 EP by Secret

Songs
 "Madonna", a 1988 song by Sparks from Interior Design
 "Madonna", a 2010 song by Secret from Madonna
 "Madonna", a 2015 song by Drake from If You're Reading This It's Too Late
 "Madonna", a 2021 song by Bausa
 "Madonna", a 2021 song by Luna
 "Madonna", a 2021 song by Snail Mail from Valentine

Places
 Madonna di Campiglio, a village and ski resort in Trento, Italy
 Madonna di Campagna, a quarter and subway station in Turin, Italy
 Madonna, Maryland, an unincorporated community in the United States

Other uses
 Madonna (book), a 2001 biography of the singer by Andrew Morton
 Madonna (studio), a Japanese adult video company

See also

 Madona, city in Latvia
 
 
 Madonna and Child (disambiguation)
 Donna (disambiguation)
 Maradona (disambiguation)